Delta is a village in Madison Parish, Louisiana, United States. The population was 239 at the 2000 census. It is part of the Tallulah Micropolitan Statistical Area.

As the birthplace of African-American entrepreneur Madam C.J. Walker, the first American woman to become a millionaire by her own business achievements, it has been included as one of 26 featured sites on the Louisiana African American Heritage Trail. In nearby Tallulah, Louisiana, the parish seat, a related site is the Hermione Museum, which has an exhibit about Walker.

Geography
Delta is located at  (32.321342, -90.936544).

Demographics

2020 census

As of the 2020 United States census, there were 232 people, 104 households, and 89 families residing in the village.

2000 census
As of the census of 2000, there were 239 people, 101 households, and 62 families residing in the village. The racial makeup of the village was 94.98% White, 2.51% African American, 0.42% Native American, 0.42% from other races, and 1.67% from two or more races. Hispanic or Latino of any race were 3.35% of the population.

There were 101 households, out of which 32.7% had children under the age of 18 living with them, 51.5% were married couples living together, 8.9% had a female householder with no husband present, and 38.6% were non-families. 33.7% of all households were made up of individuals, and 12.9% had someone living alone who was 65 years of age or older. The average household size was 2.37 and the average family size was 3.00.

In the village, the population was spread out, with 25.9% under the age of 18, 12.6% from 18 to 24, 28.0% from 25 to 44, 22.2% from 45 to 64, and 11.3% who were 65 years of age or older. The median age was 34 years. For every 100 females, there were 82.4 males. For every 100 females age 18 and over, there were 86.3 males.

The median income for a household in the village was $29,750, and the median income for a family was $33,214. Males had a median income of $37,708 versus $18,929 for females. The per capita income for the village was $15,346. About 9.6% of families and 12.5% of the population were below the poverty line, including 14.6% of those under the age of eighteen and 38.9% of those 65 or over.

Climate
The climate in this area is characterized by relatively high temperatures and evenly distributed precipitation throughout the year.  According to the Köppen Climate Classification system, Delta has a Humid subtropical climate, abbreviated "Cfa" on climate maps.

Notable person
 Curtis Pollard, a minister, farmer, store keeper and state legislator who served in the Louisiana State Senate during the Reconstruction era. 
 Madam C.J. Walker, the African-American hair care entrepreneur, tycoon and philanthropist was born at Delta in 1867.

References

Villages in Madison Parish, Louisiana
Villages in Louisiana
Louisiana African American Heritage Trail